Herlev station is a station on the Frederikssund radial of the S-train network in Copenhagen, Denmark. It serves the central part of Herlev municipality. Local busses from the bus terminal outside the station provide connections to remoter areas of the municipality.

History
Herlev was one of the original stations on the railway to Frederikssund, which opened on 17 June 1879. S-train service began on 15 May 1949.

See also
 List of railway stations in Denmark

References

S-train (Copenhagen) stations
Railway stations opened in 1879
Buildings and structures in Herlev Municipality
Railway stations in Denmark opened in the 19th century